Incident at Echo Six is a 1958 British TV play set during the Cyprus Emergency (1955-1959). It starred Barry Foster and Tony Garnett. It was the TV debut of writer Troy Kennedy Martin who had done his national service in Cyprus. It led to Martin joining the BBC script department. It is unknown if a copy of the play still exists.

References

External links

Incident at Echo Six at BFI

Films set in the 1950s
Films set in Cyprus
British television plays
1958 television plays
Cyprus Emergency
Television episodes written by Troy Kennedy Martin